Sergei Matosyan is an Armenian-Abkhazian colonel and opposition politician. He became the Deputy Speaker of the People's Assembly of Abkhazia in 2010, and is a former Minister.

Career
Matosyan participated in the 1992–1993 war with Georgia, holding the rank of colonel and heading three battalions. In 1994, Matosyan headed the Bagramyan Battalion during the Lata operation in the Kodori Valley. He was the only Armenian of the war to command Abkhaz troops. For his achievements, Matosyan was awarded the title Hero of Abkhazia. After the war, Matosyan became head of the republican border guard.

Matosyan was first elected to the People's Assembly of Abkhazia in 1996, which he left in 2000 to become Deputy Minister for the Interior responsible for staffing.

During the 4 October 2004 Presidential election, Matosyan supported Sergei Shamba's candidacy, and he was one of the leaders of his Social-Democratic Party.

On 14 December 2004, while Vladislav Ardzinba was still President, he issued a decree creating a Ministerial portfolio for Emergency Situations, and appointing Matosyan to this new post. 12 days after Sergei Bagapsh was sworn in as President on 12 February 2005, he repealed Ardzinba's decree and Matosyan did not return in the new cabinet.

Matosyan was again elected to the People's Assembly in the 4 March 2007 election, winning a first round victory in the Pshap constituency no. 22. Matosyan was subsequently nominated by Adgur Kharazia for the post of third Deputy Speaker, but lost out to Albert Ovsepyan. On 24 September 2010, Matosyan was nevertheless elected Deputy Speaker (with 22 votes out of 24 cast in favour), after Albert Ovsepyan had retired on 3 May on account of old age.

At the 11 May 2007 founding congress of the opposition veterans' organisation Aruaa, Matosyan was elected into its supreme council.

References

Living people
4th convocation of the People's Assembly of Abkhazia
Abkhaz Armenians
2nd convocation of the People's Assembly of Abkhazia
Ministers for Emergency Situations of Abkhazia
Year of birth missing (living people)